Deadwood Reservoir is a reservoir in the western United States, in Valley County, Idaho. The river flows south from the dam and is a tributary of the South Fork of the Payette River. The reservoir and vicinity is commonly used for camping, water skiing, fishing, canoeing, and other outdoor recreation.

Approved by President Calvin Coolidge in 1928, the isolated site required substantial road building. Construction of the concrete arch dam began in late 1929 and was completed in March 1931.

Climate

Summer
The temperature can get hot in late July and early August.  Rain and wind may frequent the area unpredictably.  The climate is much like that of other high mountain lakes in Idaho.

Plant life
Huckleberries
Various evergreens (mostly pine trees of one sort or another)

Wildlife

Fish
Rainbow trout
Kokanee salmon
Landlock fall chinook salmon
Bull trout
Cutthroat trout

Mammals
Chipmunks
Deer
Elk
Moose
Wolves
Black bears
Bats

Reptiles
Garter snakes
Rattle snakes

Birds
Bald eagles
Blue Grouse
Osprey
Turkey vulture

Video
YouTube - video - Deadwood Reservoir - 2009-09-12

References

External links

U.S. Bureau of Reclamation - Deadwood Dam
Boise National Forest – Recreation
Recreation.gov – Deadwood Reservoir
U.S. Bureau of Reclamation - major storage reservoirs in the Boise & Payette River basins - current levels & flows
AirNav.com – Deadwood Dam Airstrip
Pictures of Cascade – Deadwood Dam – July 2006
Flickr.com – Deadwood Dam, Idaho

Buildings and structures in Valley County, Idaho
Lakes of Valley County, Idaho
Reservoirs in Idaho
Protected areas of Valley County, Idaho
Boise National Forest
Dams in Idaho
United States Bureau of Reclamation dams
Dams completed in 1931
Boise Project